Samuel Hoare may refer to:
 Samuel Hoare Jr (1751–1825), British Quaker and abolitionist
 Sir Samuel Hoare, 1st Baronet (1841–1915), British Conservative politician, MP 1886-1906
 Samuel Hoare, 1st Viscount Templewood (1880–1959), British Conservative politician, Foreign Secretary

See also
 Sam Hoare (disambiguation)